This list shows previous winners of various events and tournaments held by Cyberathlete Professional League since its foundation in 1997.

Aliens versus Predator 2 
 2001 - CPL World Championship Event:  Johnathan 'Fatal1ty' Wendel (Fatal1ty)
Grand Prize
-Modified Ford Focus
-Darkhorse Comics
-Alien Legacy DVD set
-Predator DVD
-Motorola cell Phone

John Parsons
2nd Prize
-Home theater system
-Alien Cold Cast kit
-Alien Legacy DVD set
-Predator DVD
-PNY GeForce 3 TI 500
-Motorola cell phone

Justin Johnson
3rd Prize
-Home theater system
-Alien Cold Cast kit
-Alien Legacy DVD set
-Predator DVD
-Motorola cell phone

Mark Lam 
Alfred Mendoza
Charles King
Steven Marley
Jon Huebner
4th - 8th Prize
PNY GeForce 3 TI 500
Pair Motorola Talkabouts
Southpole backpack and T-shirt

David Skinner
Jay Umboh
Ben Stanton
David Barrack
9th- 12th Prize
PNY GeForce 3 TI 500
Southpole backpack and T-shirt

Max Hamling (Female) 
Chris Malone
Matt ****s
Cory Peters
Adam Wellen
13th- 16th Prize
Motorola cell phone
Southpole backpack and T-shirt

Kevin Malone
Jason Smith
Ry Racherbaumer
Josh Shubert
Chris Popp
Gabriel Brock
Theron Speer
Fernando Sanchez
17th – 24th Prize
Zippo Aliens lighter
Southpole backpack and T-shirt

Call of Duty 
 2004 - Cyberathlete Extreme Summer Championships:  United 5
Jacob "NightFaLL" Stanton, Jon "Platinum" Byrne, Tim "FireBlade" Lobes, Daniel "D.Garza" Garza, Rusty "in$ight" Kuperberg and Chris "47" Maglio.

Counter-Strike

Counter-Strike: Source 
 2005 - Cyberathlete Extreme Summer Championships:  PowersGaming
 2007 - Cyberathlete Extreme Summer Championships:  TeamPandemic
 2007 - Cyberathlete Extreme Winter Championships:  Team XFX

Day of Defeat 
 2004 - Cyberathlete Extreme Winter Championships:  Highball
 2005 - Cyberathlete Extreme Summer Championships:  Check Six
 2006 - WSVG Summer Intel Championships 2006:  compLexity

Descent III 
 1999 - Descent 3 World Championships:  Chris "fatal" Bond

Doom 3 
 2004 - Cyberathlete Extreme Winter Championships:  Meng 'RocketBoy' Yang

FIFA 
 2003 - CPL Europe Cannes:  Marco "OmniRocket" Jongerius

F.E.A.R. 
 2005 - Cyberathlete Extreme Winter Championships:  Neal "cleaner" Sisbarro
 2008 - CPL World Tour Finals 2007:  Henrik "Jagad" Dahl

Halo PC 
 2003 - CPL Pentium 4 Winter Championship:  Xeno
 2004 - Cyberathlete Extreme Summer Championships:  
Team CB_13 (Sygnosis,Crimson Optix)

Halo 2 
 2005 - Cyberathlete Extreme Summer Championships:  List of Championship Gaming Series teams#3D.NYTeam 3D
 2005 - Cyberathlete Extreme Winter Championships:  ABob - Alex Redard

Midtown Madness 2 
 2000 - Gateway Country Challenge:  John 'Linfalgamo' Benedict

Painkiller 
 2004 - Cyberathlete Extreme Summer Championships:  Sander 'Vo0' Kaasjager (Team Fnatic)
 2004 - Cyberathlete Extreme Winter Championships:  Sander 'Vo0' Kaasjager (Team Fnatic)
 2005 - CPL World Tour, Turkey:  Sander 'Vo0' Kaasjager (Team Fnatic)
 2005 - CPL World Tour, Spain:  Stephan 'SteLam' Lammert  (SK Gaming)
 2005 - CPL World Tour, Brazil:  Sander 'Vo0' Kaasjager (Team Fnatic)
 2005 - CPL World Tour, Sweden:  Sander 'Vo0' Kaasjager (Team Fnatic)
 2005 - CPL World Tour, USA:  Johnathan 'Fatal1ty' Wendel (Fatal1ty)
 2005 - CPL World Tour, UK:  Sander 'Vo0' Kaasjager (Team Fnatic)
 2005 - CPL World Tour, Singapore:  Johnathan 'Fatal1ty' Wendel (Fatal1ty)
 2005 - CPL World Tour, Italy:  Sander 'Vo0' Kaasjager (Team Fnatic)
 2005 - CPL World Tour, Chile:  Alexander "ztrider" Ingarv (Team Fnatic)
 2005 - CPL World Tour Final:  Johnathan 'Fatal1ty' Wendel (Fatal1ty)

Quake I 
 1997 - The FRAG:  Tom 'Gollum' Dawson
 1998 - The CPL Event:  Dan 'Rix' Hammans
 2001 - CPL 4-Year Anniversary Event:  Harley 'HarlsoM' Grey

Quake II 
 1998 - FRAG 2:  Dan 'Rix' Hammans
 1999 - Extreme Annihilation:  Kurt 'Immortal' Shimada

Quake II Female 
 1999 - GroundZero:  Anne "Lilith" Chang

Quake III 
 1999 - FRAG 3:  Amir 'Hakeem' Haleem
 1999 - GroundZero:  Mark 'Wombat' Larsen
 2000 - Razer CPL Event:  Johnathan 'Fatal1ty' Wendel
 2000 - CPL Asia Atomic Arena:  Henrik 'Blue' Björk
 2000 - CPL Europe Mplayer:  Johnathan 'Fatal1ty' Wendel
 2000 - Babbage's CPL Event:  John 'ZeRo4' Hill
 2001 - CPL Pacific Atomic Event:  Johnathan 'Fatal1ty' Wendel
 2001 - CPL Latin America(Brazil):  Thomaz `Fist1syn` Lysakowski Fortes in April 2001, São Paulo
 2001 - CPL Latin America (Brazil):  Guilherme 'reef' Bento Radominski
 2001 - CPL Europe (Netherlands):  Alexey "death" Alexeev
 2002 - Nostromo Exhibition Tournament:  John 'ZeRo4' Hill
 2006 - CPL World Season Singapore:  Fan "Jibo" Zhibo
 2006 - CPL World Season Australia:  Andrew "Python" Chacha
 2006 - CPL World Season Brazil:  Daniel "Ryu" Souza De Lima
 2006 - CPL World Season Italy:  Magnus "fojii" Olsson
 2006 - CPL World Season Nordic:  Fan "Jibo" Zhibo
 2006 - CPL World Season Finals:  Paul "czm" Nelson

Quake III Female 
 2000 - FRAG 4:  Cary 'Succubus' Szeto
 2000 - Babbage's CPL Event:  Cary 'Succubus' Szeto

Quake III Team Deathmatch 
 2000 - FRAG 4:  Clan Kapitol
 2002 - CPL Europe (Cologne):  forZe

Quake IV 
 2005 - Cyberathlete Extreme Winter Championships:  Anton "cooller" Singov (mousesports)

Team Fortress Classic 
 2002 - CPL Pentium 4 Winter Event:  Vindicate
Structure
Vr_
FeaR
Brick
Macros
KidDeath
Stickgod
the_ROCK
Captain Ron
Rent-A-Knight
Hummer

Unreal Tournament 2003 
 2001 - CPL Pentium 4 Winter Event:   Thaddeus Napier 
 2002 - CPL Pentium 4 Winter Event:  Jonathan 'Fatal1ty' Wendel

Unreal Tournament 2004 
 2004 - Cyberathlete Extreme Summer Championships:  SK Gaming

Warcraft III 
 2002 - CPL Europe Oslo:  Dimitar "DIDI8" Aleksandrov
 2003 - CPL Europe Cannes:  Eric "InToX" Dieulangard
 2003 - CPL Europe Copenhagen:  Bjarke "Bjarke" Rasmussen
 2005 - CPL Istanbul:  Manuel "Grubby" Schenkhuizen
 2005 - CPL Chile:  Rodolfo "Virus" Ehrhorn
 2005 - Cyberathlete Extreme Summer Championships:  Yoan "ToD" Merlo (4Kings)
 2011 - CPL Invitational 2011:  Huang "TH000" Xiang

World In Conflict

References

Video game culture
Cyberathlete Professional League
Cyberathlete Professional League champions